Akela is a genus of jumping spiders (family Salticidae), consisting of three described species. Two of these occur in Central and South America and the third in Pakistan.

Name 

The genus name is derived from Akela, "The Lone Wolf" from Rudyard Kipling's Jungle Book. Other salticid genera with names of Kipling's characters are  Bagheera, Messua and Nagaina.

Species 

 Akela charlottae Peckham & Peckham, 1896, found in Central America (Guatemala, Panama).
 Akela fulva Dyal, 1935, found in Pakistan.
 Akela ruricola Galiano, 1999, found in South America (Brazil, Uruguay, Argentina).

References

Further reading 
 Galiano, M. E. (1989), "Note on the genera Admestina and Akela (Araneae, Salticidae)", Bull. British Arachnol. Soc., 8(2): 49-50.

External links 
 Diagnostic drawings of A. ruricola 

Salticidae genera
Spiders of Central America
Spiders of South America
Spiders of Asia
Salticidae